Bolma sabinae is a species of sea snail, a marine gastropod mollusk in the family Turbinidae, the turban snails.

Description
The height of the shell attains 16.2 mm, its diameter 19.1 mm. The coniform shell consists of five whorls and resembles Bolma minutiradiosa Kosuge, 1983, but the thick columellar and umbilical callus is red-stained.

Distribution
This marine species occurs off Madagascar.

References

 Alf A. & Kreipl K. 2004. A new Bolma (Gastropoda, Turbinidae) from Madagascar. Spixiana, 27(2): 183-184

sabinae
Gastropods described in 2004